Darlan Romani (born 9 April 1991 in Concórdia) is a Brazilian track and field athlete specialising in the shot put. Indoor World Champion in 2022, he also finished 4th at the 2020 Olympic Games, 4th at the 2019 World Championships, and was champion of the 2019 Pan American Games.

Professional athletics career
Darlan has had the Brazilian shot put record since 2012. Since then, he has broken the record so often that even he knows exactly how many national records he beat. He surpassed the mark again and again in early 2015 when he reached 20.90m.

He is the first Brazilian to qualify for the Shot Put at the Olympics in 80 years - Antonio Pereira Lira was the last who did it, at the Berlin Games, in 1936.

At the 2016 Summer Olympics, in the Men's shot put, he broke the Brazilian record two times (20.94 meters in the qualifying round and 21.02 meters in the final), finishing 5th. It was the best participation of a Brazilian in the event.

On June 3, 2017, he broke the South American record once again with 21.82 during the Brazilian leg of the IAAF World Challenge, São Bernardo do Campo.

In March 2018, he finished 4th place in the Indoor World Championship, with a 21.37 mark, a new indoor South American record.

In early September 2018, representing the Americas in the IAAF Continental Cup, Darlan won gold with a 21.89 weight-shot, defeating 2017 World Champion Tom Walsh.

On September 15, 2018, became the first South American to reach the mark of 22 m. In the Brazil Trophy, he got the exact mark of 22.00, again breaking the South American record. Fewer than 30 athletes have achieved this mark throughout the history of the event.

At the end of 2018, he won the trophy for Best Athlete in Athletics at the Brazil Olympic Award. He finished 5th in the world ranking of Shot Put in 2018.

In June 2019, at the Eugene stage of the Diamond League, he obtained the 10th-best mark (by athlete) in History in the Shot Put, 22.61. He broke the South American record three times in the same event (22.46, 22.55, and 22.61). This would have given him gold in any Olympics or World Championships.

At the 2019 Pan American Games held in Lima, Peru, even though he had a throat infection that left him with a severe fever the day before the race, he won the gold medal, beating the Pan American Games record, with the mark of 22.07 m.

In the Diamond League 2019, he finished as runner-up overall.

At the 2019 World Athletics Championships held in Doha, Qatar, the greatest and strongest competition of all time in the Shot Put was held. Tom Walsh threw 22.90m on the first try. Romani threw 22.53m on his second attempt, which put him in second place at that moment. American Ryan Crouser threw 22.71m on his fourth attempt, putting Romani back in 3rd place. On their last puts, the American Joe Kovacs threw  22.91m, and Crouser got 22.90m, both finishing with gold and silver, with Walsh finishing with the bronze. Romani finished in 4th place, the only one who put over 22 m, along with the three medalists. It was the best result for Brazil in World Championships in this competition. Since 1990 no one had thrown a weight over 22.80m, and the top four places in this competition (including Romani)  broke the World Championship record of 22.23m.

Romani had several complications with training in 2020 and 2021: he and his family got COVID. Darlan lost 10 kg in 14 days. Because his training center was closed in 2020, he had to improvise on the ground next to his house. Without proper training equipment, in early 2021, pain from a herniated disc forced Darlan to take a break for 45 days of rehabilitation. Romani also had problems with not being able to train with his coach for several months. Romani overcame these adversities and qualified for the Olympics. Taking part in the 2020 Olympic Games in Tokyo, Romani calmly qualified for the final with a mark of 21.31. In the final, Romani had a good first shot of 21.88, but, not being in his best form due to problems in the period before the Games, he couldn't get a shot over 22 meters in the later shots, finishing in 4th place. The bronze medal went to Tom Walsh with 22.47. The 4th position, however, is the best in the history of Brazil in this event in the Olympic Games.

On March 19, 2022, Romani achieved the biggest feat of his career by becoming World Champion, defeating Ryan Crouser, current world record holder and Olympic champion of the event, who hadn't lost a competition in the last three years. Romani far surpassed his South American indoor record of 21.71, which had been set a month earlier. He achieved the mark of 22.53, beating the record of the World Athletics Indoor Championships.

Personal bests
Shot put (outdoor): 22.61 m –  Palo Alto, California, USA, 30 June 2019
Shot put (indoor): 22.53 m –  Belgrade, Serbia, 19 March 2022

Competition record

References

External links

Living people
1991 births
Brazilian male shot putters
Sportspeople from Santa Catarina (state)
Athletes (track and field) at the 2015 Pan American Games
Athletes (track and field) at the 2019 Pan American Games
World Athletics Championships athletes for Brazil
Athletes (track and field) at the 2016 Summer Olympics
Olympic athletes of Brazil
South American Games gold medalists for Brazil
South American Games silver medalists for Brazil
South American Games medalists in athletics
Competitors at the 2014 South American Games
Athletes (track and field) at the 2018 South American Games
Pan American Games gold medalists for Brazil
Pan American Games medalists in athletics (track and field)
Pan American Games athletes for Brazil
South American Championships in Athletics winners
IAAF Continental Cup winners
Pan American Games gold medalists in athletics (track and field)
Medalists at the 2019 Pan American Games
Ibero-American Championships in Athletics winners
South American Games gold medalists in athletics
Troféu Brasil de Atletismo winners
Athletes (track and field) at the 2020 Summer Olympics
World Athletics Indoor Championships winners